Karen Memory is a steampunk novel by Elizabeth Bear. It was published by Tor Books, on February 3, 2015; a Japanese-language version was published on October 20, 2017.

In 2018, a sequel, "Stone Mad", was released.

Synopsis

In an alternate 1878, Karen Memery ("like memory only spelt with an e") is a teenage prostitute in the Pacific Northwest, whose life becomes complicated by the arrival of a serial killer, by a rival pimp's attempt to run for mayor, and by mad science.

Reception

National Public Radio described the novel as "a bracing yet charming adventure yarn," praising Bear for giving Karen a "strong, sympathetic, charismatic voice" whose "narrative is sharp, sly, and full of heart." Locus considered it a "delight" and a "tour-de-force", comparing Karen to Huckleberry Finn, while Kirkus Reviews found the characters to be "lively" and "engaging", with an "intriguing" and "steampunk-ishly surreal" plot. Cheryl Morgan commended Bear for "straddl(ing) the fine line between sounding authentic and being irritating", and for depicting a multicultural and intersectional society, but found Bear's portrayal of a transgender character to be non-optimal, and conceded that readers "who identify more closely with other characters in the book's highly diverse cast" may find the portrayals of those characters to be similarly non-optimal.

References

External links
Elizabeth Bear discusses Karen Memory at Skiffy and Fanty

2015 science fiction novels
Steampunk novels
Works by Elizabeth Bear
2015 American novels
Tor Books books